The Chambers Brothers were a criminal organization heavily involved in the distribution of crack cocaine in the city of Detroit, Michigan, during the 1980s. The brothers consisted of: B.J., Larry, Willie and Otis Chambers. They also had three other sisters and a set of twin brothers. One of the twins, Fredrick, became known for being a top notch military drill sergeant in California. The siblings moved to Memphis, Tennessee, while the four brothers became notorious nationally when the Detroit Police Department confiscated video tapes of the brothers counting their laundry baskets full of money, and flaunting their excessive wealth. Their mother died in 2003.

Cultural effects 
In the novel Warpath by Jeffry Scott Hansen, the street gang the Six-Mile Syndicate is based loosely on the Chambers Brothers gang.

In the 1991 film New Jack City, the character Nino Brown and his associates were largely based on the Chambers Brothers. As in the movie, the Chambers Brothers were also known for taking over an apartment complex known as the Broadmoor on E. Grand Blvd and Ferry St. on the lower east side in Detroit (name was changed to "The Carter" in the film), which was used to house the gang’s drug-selling operations.

References

External links
BET's American Gangster first aired on January 9, 2007.
Time magazine article from 1988 describing the gang. "I'm going to Detroit!"
Land of Opportunity: One Family's Quest for the American Dream in the Age of Crack, Adler, William M. 

Former gangs in Detroit
African-American history in Detroit
African-American gangsters
American gangsters
African-American organized crime groups